is a Japanese politician from the Liberal Democratic Party. As of 2014 he served as member of the House of Councillors for Akita At-large district.

References

1979 births
Living people
Politicians from Akita Prefecture
Members of the House of Councillors (Japan)
Liberal Democratic Party (Japan) politicians
21st-century Japanese politicians